Mujpur, also spelled Munjpur is a village in Sankheshwar Taluka of Patan district in Gujarat, India.

Place of interest
There is a mosque with a Persian writings in the name of Zafar Khan (1391-1411), son of Wajih-ul-mulk, the founder of the Muzaffarid dynasty of Gujarat Sultanate. In 1816 it suffered a heavy loss, the great plague having carried off about one-half of its people. In 1820 Munjpur had insignificant fortifications.

Notable people
 Chimanlal Trivedi, Gujarati writer

References

Villages in Patan district